CBS Sports Radio is a sports radio network that debuted with hourly sports news updates on September 4, 2012, and with 24/7 programming on January 2, 2013.

CBS Sports Radio is owned by Paramount Global and distributed by Westwood One. Programming on the network features reporters and personalities from CBS Sports, CBS Sports Network, and CBSSports.com. CBS Sports Radio is broadcast throughout the United States on radio affiliates and streamed online. From launch until November 17, 2017, it was operated by CBS Radio until its merger with Entercom. Entercom, which later became Audacy, Inc., continued to manage the network under a licensing agreement with CBS. The rights to the CBS logo, but not the name, expired at the end of 2019.

Stations
CBS Sports Radio airs on more than 300 stations nationwide. The nominal flagship station of CBS Sports Radio is WFAN / WFAN-FM in New York City (although WFAN-AM-FM only carry some brief reports and occasional weekend shows from the network).  Since WFAS shifted to conservative talk in 2021, New York City has had no full-time CBS Sports Radio affiliate station, although the network is heard around the clock on an HD Radio digital subchannel of WFAN-FM.  WFAS and WHLD Niagara Falls-Buffalo were among numerous Cumulus Media stations that had been part of the network's core affiliates but flipped to conservative talk. 

Audacy also distanced itself from the network when it shifted focus to its own in-house BetQL network, which features discussions of gambling, in 2021.  The BetQL stations continue to carry some CBS Sports Radio programs, including The Jim Rome Show and its late night programming.

Other affiliate stations include:

Programming

Weekend broadcasters can and do vary regularly

References

External links

CBS Sports Radio

Sports radio networks in the United States
 
Radio stations established in 2012
 
Sirius XM Radio channels